Vișniovca is a village in Cantemir District, Moldova.

Gallery

References

Villages of Cantemir District